Crozet House, also known as the Curtis Carter House, is a historic home located in Richmond, Virginia.  It was built in 1814, and was originally built as a two-story, five bay, "L"-shaped brick house over a raised basement in the late-Federal style.  It obtained its present "U"-shape after the addition of an east wing to the rear of the house.  It was built by Curtis Carter, a local brick mason and contractor.

The architecture firm of Marcellus Wright Jr. maintained offices in Crozet House. It was listed on the National Register of Historic Places in 1972.

References

External links 
Curtis Carter House, 100 East Main Street, Richmond, Independent City, VA: 5 photos at Historic American Buildings Survey

Historic American Buildings Survey in Virginia
Houses on the National Register of Historic Places in Virginia
Federal architecture in Virginia
Houses completed in 1814
Houses in Richmond, Virginia
National Register of Historic Places in Richmond, Virginia